Ernst Beetschen (born 4 September 1953) is a Swiss skier. He competed in the Nordic combined event at the 1980 Winter Olympics.

References

External links
 

1953 births
Living people
Swiss male Nordic combined skiers
Olympic Nordic combined skiers of Switzerland
Nordic combined skiers at the 1980 Winter Olympics
Place of birth missing (living people)